Golden Lotus may refer to:

Ensete lasiocarpum, the plant that produces the Golden Lotus flower
Golden Lotus (album), a 1982 album by Kenny Barron

Jin Ping Mei
Jin Ping Mei, a 17th-century Chinese novel
Pan Jinlian, the female protagonist of the novel, also translated as "Golden Lotus"
The Golden Lotus (film), a 1974 Hong Kong film based on the novel
Golden Lotus (musical), a musical based on the novel

Film awards
Golden Lotus Awards (Macau International Movie Festival)
Golden Lotus Awards (Vietnam Film Festival)
National Film Awards, several feature film awards are known as Golden Lotus Awards